Challenge of the Range is a 1949 American Western film directed by Ray Nazarro and written by Ed Earl Repp. The film stars Charles Starrett, Paula Raymond, Billy Halop, Steve Darrell, Henry Hall, Robert Filmer and Smiley Burnette. The film was released on February 3, 1949, by Columbia Pictures.

Plot

Cast          
Charles Starrett as Steve Roper / The Durango Kid
Paula Raymond as Judy Barton
Billy Halop as Reb Matson 
Steve Darrell as Cal Matson
Henry Hall as Jim Barton
Robert Filmer as Grat Largo
Smiley Burnette as Smiley Burnette

References

External links
 

1949 films
1940s English-language films
American Western (genre) films
1949 Western (genre) films
Columbia Pictures films
Films directed by Ray Nazarro
American black-and-white films
1940s American films